Events in the year 2021 in Colombia.

Incumbents
 President: Iván Duque Márquez
 Vice President: Marta Lucía Ramírez

Events
Ongoing — COVID-19 pandemic in Colombia
Ongoing — 2021 Colombian protests

January to March
January 5 – General Luis Fernando Navarro says that illegal armed groups lost 5,120 members in 2020. The number includes deaths, capture, and desertions. He said the National Liberation Army (ELN) still has 2,450 members and Revolutionary Armed Forces of Colombia (FARC) has 2,500.
January 17 – Scientists say the cocaine hippos in the Magdalena river basin are breeding voraciously and are an increasing menace so they must be culled.
January 25
FARC changes its name to Comunes ("Commoners").
Notorious paramilitary commander, drug trafficker, and sexual abuser of young girls Hernán Giraldo Serna (“El Taladro”) finishes his sentence in the United States and returns to Colombia.
January 29 – 647 Haitian nationals, 23 Cubans, and 19 migrants from African countries are stranded on a beach in Necoclí, Antioquia Department, hoping to pass through the Darién Gap to Panama and the United States.
January 31 – Seven adults and seven children are killed and 16 people are missing after two boats collide near Tumaco, Nariño Department.
February 8 – Cuba warns of an attack on Bogotá by the ELN in the "next few days." Mayor Claudia López Hernández and Defense Minister Diego Molano Vega say they take the threat seriously.
February 25 – Juan Francisco Sarasti Jaramillo, 82, archbishop of Roman Catholic Archdiocese of Cali (2002–2011); COVID-19.
March 3 – Ten former members of FARC are killed in a military bombing on Calamar, Guaviare. Three “dissidents” are captured.
March 10 – A 26-year-old woman and her 4-year-old daughter are killed in a landslide in Siloé, Cali.
March 27 – A car bomb explodes in Corinto, Cauca, injuring eleven. A later report indicates 43 were injured.
March 30 – The government sets up a camp in Arauquita, Arauca, Arauca for 4,700 refugees from Apure, Venezuela.

April to June
28 April - present - 2021 Colombian protests

Deaths

January to March
 
 

1 January – Pablo Hernández, racing cyclist (born 1940).
2 January – Laura Weinstein, transexual activist; respiratory complications.
11 January – Luis Adriano Piedrahita, 74, Roman Catholic bishop and theologian; COVID-19; (b. 1946)
12 January – Álvaro Mejía, long-distance runner (born 1940).
14 January – Antún Castro Urrutia, 74, musician and actor.
15 January – Gildardo García, chess player (born 1954).
21 January – Calixto Avena, 77, footballer; COVID-19.
26 January – Carlos Holmes Trujillo, 69, politician, Defense Minister; COVID-19.
27 January – Bertulfo Álvarez, 69, guerrilla fighter (Caribbean Bloc of the FARC-EP).
2 February
Héctor Epalza Quintero, 80, Bishop of Roman Catholic Diocese of Buenaventura (2004–2017).
Yordan Guetio, social activist in Corinto, Cauca; murdered.
17 February – Beder Guerra Gutiérrez, 67, journalist.
21 February – Mireya Arboleda, 92, classical pianist.
23 February – Herbin Hoyos, 53, journalist and broadcaster (Las voces del secuestro) who was in exile in Spain; COVID-19.
28 February – Jorge Oñate, 71, vallenato singer; complications from COVID-19.
2 March – Telma Barria Pinzón, diplomat (consul of Panama in Colombia); drowned
24 March – Pedro Saúl Morales, 61, racing cyclist; heart attack.
29 March – Antonio Caro, 71, conceptual artist; heart failure.

April to June
11 April - Guillermo Berrio, 53, footballer; cardiac arrest
14 April - Eduardo Enríquez Maya, 72, politician; COVID-19
1 May - José Daniel Falla Robles, 65, bishop; COVID-19
13 May - Pablo Uribe, 90, Olympic fencer
17 May - Jesús Santrich, 54, revolutionary; murdered
26 May - Arturo de Jesús Correa Toro, 80, bishop; COVID-19

References

 
Colombia
Colombia
2020s in Colombia
Years of the 21st century in Colombia